Matthew Peacock is an Australian journalist and author who has worked for Australia's ABC News in television and radio since 1973, authoring a critically lauded book on the asbestos industry during that time, and becoming a staff-elected director of the network.

Peacock "began his career with the ABC in 1973 as a trainee with the TV current affairs program This Day Tonight". In 2089, he wrote a prize-winning radio program on the New South Wales town of Baryulgil, where the health of the local Aborigines had been affected by the local asbestos manufacturing industry. Peacock became the chief political correspondent for current affairs radio in Canberra, and worked as a foreign correspondent in the United States in the early 1990s (in Washington, D.C. from 1990 to 1992 and New York City in 1993), and in London from 2001 to 2003. Over the course of his career, he "played a pivotal role in uncovering the corruption and spin of the asbestos industry over three decades, and his story was told in the mini series Devil's Dust which screened on ABC TV in 2012".

In 2013, Peacock became the first staff-elected director of ABC following reinstatement of that position by the new Australian government. As a board member, he participated in deciding where $254 million should be cut from ABC's budget; in 2014, he learned that he was facing termination as a redundant employee, under the same budget cuts. In 2015, after ABC News faced criticism for allowing Zaky Mallah to ask a question on the ABC program Q&A, Peacock wrote an email urging ABC News staff to "maintain our statutory commitment to fearless, impartial and independent coverage", while asking "my colleagues at News Corporation to resist pressure to mount unfair and provocative attacks on their fellow journalists".

Killer Company and Devil's Dust
Beginning in 1977, Peacock engaged in a lengthy investigation of the use of harmful asbestos fibre in building materials produced by James Hardie Industries, culminating in his 2009 the book, Killer Company: James Hardie Exposed. In the book, Peacock documents how Hardie's practices "led to the deaths of thousands of workers and customers, who were never informed of the dangers", resulting in medical abnormalities, such as asbestosis. According to Peacock, James Hardie Industries circumvented the rules and regulations designed to protect the community from serious health hazards. Peacock states that "Hardie embarked on a cold, calculated strategy to maximise profits, minimise compensation and conceal the culprits".

Killer Company was a finalist for the Walkley non-fiction book of the year in 2009. In 2012, Devil's Dust, a docudrama based on Killer Company, was released, with Ewen Leslie portraying Peacock.

References

External links
ABC News page on Matt Peacock
Personal website of Matt Peacock

Living people
Date of birth missing (living people)
Australian journalists
Year of birth missing (living people)
Australian non-fiction crime writers